

Medalists

Men

Men's Medal table

Women's Medal table

Women

References
 European Federation of American Football
 European Flag Football Championship 2013
 International Federation of American Football

Flag football